George Alton Youngblood (born January 4, 1945) is a former American football player who played for Los Angeles Rams, Cleveland Browns, Chicago Bears, and New Orleans Saints of the National Football League (NFL). He played college football at Los Angeles State College.

References

1945 births
Living people
American football defensive ends
Cal State Los Angeles Diablos football players
Los Angeles Rams players
Cleveland Browns players
New Orleans Saints players
Chicago Bears players
Players of American football from Los Angeles
American football defensive backs